Verus of Lyon is the sixth bishop of Lyon. He succeeds Saint Faustin in the second half of the 3rd century.

His name is known to us from the various lists of the first archbishops of Lyon and chronicles the history of the Church of Lyon. After the first six remarkable and canonized Bishops, Verus was the first bishop of a dark period for the Lyon religious history that extends to the episcopate of St. Just a century later.

His name means Glass.

References 

Bishops of Lyon
3rd-century bishops in Gaul
Year of birth unknown
Year of death missing